East Autumn Grin is Matthew Ryan's second album. It was released on August 15, 2000 on A&M Records.

Track listing
All words and music by Matthew Ryan, except where noted.

"3rd of October"
"Heartache Weather"
"I Hear a Symphony"
"Me and My Lover"
"Sunk"
"Sadlylove"
"I Must Love Leaving"
"Ballad of a Limping Man"
"Time and Time Only"
"The World Is on Fire"
"Still Part Two"
"Worry" (words by Matthew Ryan, music by Matthew Ryan, David Ricketts)
"August Summer Dress" (words by Matthew Ryan, music by Matthew Ryan, David Ricketts) (hidden track)

Personnel
 Doug Lancio - acoustic guitar, electric guitar, mandolin 
 Chris Feinstein - bass, backing vocals
 Josh Rouse - backing vocals
 Johnette Napolitano - backing vocals
 Trina Shoemaker - backing vocals
 Tommy Williams - drums, percussion, backing vocals 
 Ethan Johns - drums
 Will Kimbrough - piano, electric guitar, Omnichord [ambient], synth, vocals
 Pat Sansone - piano
 Carl Meadows - piano
 David Ricketts - synth
 David Henry - cello, violin
 Ned Henry - violin
 Matthew Ryan - vocals, acoustic guitar, piano

2000 albums
Matthew Ryan (musician) albums
A&M Records albums